Daniel Wise may refer to:

Daniel Wise (author) (1813–1898), Methodist Episcopal clerical author
Daniel Wise (playwright), contemporary playwright, producer, and author
Daniel Wise (mathematician) (born 1971), American mathematician
Daniel Wise (American football), American football defensive end